Avrieux is a commune in the Savoie department in the Auvergne-Rhône-Alpes region in south-eastern France.

Geography

Climate

Avrieux has a humid continental climate (Köppen climate classification Dfb).

Twin towns — sister cities
Avrieux is twinned with Piedicavallo, Italy (2009).

See also
Communes of the Savoie department

References

External links
 Official site

Communes of Savoie